Harmonica (or the German equivalent Harmonika) can refer to:

 Harmonica, free-reed aerophone (G. Mundharmonika)
 Glass harmonica, glass ideophone (G. Glasharmonika)
 Accordion, keyboard aerophone (G. Handharmonika)